George Plaisted Sanderson (November 22, 1836 – June 10, 1915) was a Massachusetts politician who served as the 17th Mayor of Lynn, Massachusetts. Sanderson was born in Gardiner, Maine  to Aaron Sanderson He died in 1915.

Notes

1836 births
1915 deaths
Mayors of Lynn, Massachusetts
People of Massachusetts in the American Civil War
Massachusetts Greenbacks
People from Gardiner, Maine